Dzorak may refer to several places:
 Dzorak, Syunik, a village in Syunik, Armenia
 Zorak, Armenia, municipality in Ararat Province, Armenia